The 2022 Ostra Group Open was a professional tennis tournament played on clay courts. It was the 19th edition of the tournament which was part of the 2022 ATP Challenger Tour. It took place in Ostrava, Czech Republic between 25 April and 1 May.

Singles main-draw entrants

Seeds

 1 Rankings are as of 18 April 2022.

Other entrants
The following players received wildcards into the singles main draw:
  Jonáš Forejtek
  Miloš Karol
  Jakub Menšík

The following players received entry into the singles main draw as alternates:
  Attila Balázs
  Vitaliy Sachko
  Dalibor Svrčina

The following players received entry from the qualifying draw:
  Evan Furness
  Daniel Michalski
  Emilio Nava
  Pavel Nejedlý
  Mats Rosenkranz
  Lukáš Rosol

The following players received entry as lucky losers:
  Lukáš Klein
  Lucas Miedler

Champions

Singles
 
 Evan Furness def.  Ryan Peniston 4–6, 7–6(8–6), 6–1.

Doubles

 Alexander Erler /  Lucas Miedler def.  Hunter Reese /  Sem Verbeek 7–6(7–5), 7–5.

References

2022 ATP Challenger Tour
2022
2022 in Czech sport
April 2022 sports events in the Czech Republic
May 2022 sports events in the Czech Republic